This is a list of members of the Western Australian Legislative Council from 12 May 1902 to 30 May 1904. The chamber had 30 seats made up of ten provinces each electing three members, on a system of rotation whereby one-third of the members would retire at each biennial election.

Notes
 On 2 May 1902, East Province MLC Frederick Crowder, who had been elected unopposed one week earlier, died. William Loton was elected unopposed on 17 May 1902.
 On 24 January 1903, Metropolitan-Suburban Province MLC Adam Jameson resigned. Walter Kingsmill, who had resigned as the Assembly member for Pilbara to contest the seat, was elected unopposed on 9 February 1903.
 On 6 April 1903, East Province MLC Richard Burges resigned. Andrew Dempster won the resulting by-election on 6 May 1903.
 On 25 August 1903, Metropolitan-Suburban Province MLC Barrington Wood died. Zebina Lane won the resulting by-election on 11 September 1903.
 On 15 December 1903, Metropolitan-Suburban Province MLC William Brookman's seat was declared vacant on the grounds of absence without leave. Joseph Langsford won the resulting by-election on 5 January 1904.

Sources
 
 

Members of Western Australian parliaments by term